Strictly Turntablized is the second studio album by Japanese hip hop producer DJ Krush, released on November 21, 1994 by Mo' Wax. In Japan, the album was released by the Avex Trax subsidiary label Jazz Not Jazz Records on April 21, 1995, and was subsequently reissued by Sony Music Entertainment on September 9, 1998.

Critical reception

"The tubercular atmospheres and wheezing bass of the record's best tracks", wrote Peter Shapiro in Drum 'n' Bass: The Rough Guide (1999), "showed that the Down Tempo beat crew was capable of evoking something other than their own ganja-soaked hipness." In 2015, writer Daisuke Kawasaki ranked Strictly Turntablized at number 38 on his list of the "100 Greatest Rock Albums of All Time".

Track listing

Personnel
Credits are adapted from the album's liner notes.

Musicians
 DJ Krush – beats, scratching
 Noah – vocals on "The Nightmare of Ungah (Sandro in Effect)"
 Stash – vocals on "Intro" and "The Nightmare of Ungah (Sandro in Effect)"

Production
 DJ Krush – production
 Noriko Asano – executive production
 Chris Bemand – recording, engineering
 Fraser Cooke – assistance
 Tim Goldsworthy – assistance
 Tracey Myerscough – assistance

Design
 Ben Drury – logo design
 Futura 2000 – cover artwork
 Swifty – sleeve design

Charts

References

External links
 

1994 albums
DJ Krush albums
Mo' Wax albums
Avex Trax albums